John Lees of Turf Lane, Royton, Lancashire was an English inventor who made a substantial improvement to machinery for carding cotton.  

He improved the carding machine in 1772 by adding a feeder to it in the form of a perpetually revolving cloth on which cotton wool was spread to convey the wool to the cylinder. On 25 June 1785, he proved this in the course of the trial concerning the validity of Richard Arkwright's second patent (dated 1775) for his cotton-spinning water frame.  

He was one of the carding mill owners sued by Arkwright in 1781, having built a cotton mill at Fowleach at Greenacres Moor, in Oldham. He began by working a horsemill-powered cotton mill in 1776-78 but "raised himself from the extremest drudgery of the spinning room to the position of one of the most opulent inhabitants" of Oldham, with a mill and stock insured for over £2,000 in 1795.

John Lees was a Quaker and was the father of James Lees.

References

Footnotes

Further reading
E. Butterworth, Historical Sketches of Oldham (2nd edn, Oldham 1856), 116.  
S. D. Chapman, 'Fixed Capital Formation in the British Cotton Industry, 1770-1815' Economic History Review, New Series, 23(2) (1970), 244.

English inventors
Spinning
English businesspeople
People of the Industrial Revolution
People from Royton
Textile workers
Year of death unknown
Year of birth unknown